Brad Edwards (born 22 February 1968) is a former Australian rules footballer who played with Fitzroy and the Brisbane Bears in the Victorian/Australian Football League (VFL/AFL).

Originally from Perth, Edwards was picked up by Fitzroy with their second selection in the 1988 VFL draft. He played six games in 1989 but had a limited impact and at the end of the season made his way to Brisbane through the pre-season draft.

Edwards was only with the Bears for a season but was able to play 10 senior games. He was later drafted by the West Coast Eagles but he would end up making Brisbane his home and became a premiership player for Morningside. He continues to be involved in Queensland football as a coach.

References

1968 births
Australian rules footballers from Western Australia
Fitzroy Football Club players
Brisbane Bears players
Perth Football Club players
Morningside Australian Football Club players
Living people